Dhan Singh Rawat (born 24 October 1966) is a member of the 14th Lok Sabha of India. He represents the Banswara constituency of Rajasthan, and is a member of the Bharatiya Janata Party (BJP) political party.

References

External links
 Official biographical sketch in Parliament of India website

1966 births
Living people
Rajasthani politicians
Bharatiya Janata Party politicians from Rajasthan
India MPs 2004–2009
People from Banswara district
Lok Sabha members from Rajasthan